Yabrud may refer to:
 Yabroud a city in Syria
 Yabrud, Ramallah, a Palestinian village in the Ramallah and al-Bireh Governorate